"Drinkin' My Baby (Off My Mind)" is a song by American country music artist Eddie Rabbitt.  It was released in February 1976 as the first single from the album Rocky Mountain Music.  The song was Rabbitt's fourth country hit and the first of fifteen solo number one country hits.  The single stayed at number one a single week and spent a total twelve weeks on the country chart.  The song was written by Rabbitt, along with Even Stevens.

Charts

References

1976 singles
1976 songs
Eddie Rabbitt songs
Songs written by Eddie Rabbitt
Song recordings produced by David Malloy
Elektra Records singles
Songs written by Even Stevens (songwriter)